is a railway station of the Chūō Main Line, East Japan Railway Company (JR East) in the city of Uenohara, Yamanashi Prefecture, Japan.

Lines
Uenohara Station is served by the Chūō Line (Rapid) / Chūō Main Line, and is 69.8 kilometers from the terminus of the line at Tokyo Station.

Station layout
The station has a single island platform serving two tracks, connected to the station building by a footbridge. The station is staffed.

Platforms

Station history 
Uenohara Station first opened on August 1, 1901, as a station for both freight and passenger service on the Japanese Government Railways (JGR) Chūō Main Line. The JGR became the Japanese National Railways (JNR) after the end of World War II. With the dissolution and privatization of the JNR on April 1, 1987, the station came under the control of the East Japan Railway Company. Automated turnstiles using the Suica IC Card system came into operation from November 18, 2001. All express trains passed the station from March 2017. In January 2018, the Midori no Madoguchi ticket office ceased operations.

Passenger statistics
In fiscal 2017, the station was used by an average of 5041 passengers daily (boarding passengers only). Uenohara is the third busiest station in Yamanashi Prefecture after Kōfu and Ōtsuki.

Surrounding area
Uenohara City Hall
Teikyo University of Science
Japan National Route 20

See also
 List of railway stations in Japan

References

 Miyoshi Kozo. Chuo-sen Machi to eki Hyaku-niju nen. JT Publishing (2009)   
 

This article incorporates information from the corresponding article in the Japanese Wikipedia.

External links

Official home page.

Railway stations in Yamanashi Prefecture
Railway stations in Japan opened in 1901
Chūō Main Line
Stations of East Japan Railway Company
Uenohara, Yamanashi